Marion Louise Aunor is a Filipina singer, songwriter and now a movie actress.

Early career
She began her career after winning third place in the 2013 Himig Handog. Aunor is a former contract recording artist for Star Music, and is now under Viva Records. She is also the niece of actress and singer Nora Aunor.

Current career
Aunor made her debut in February 2013 with an original song called "If You Ever Change Your Mind", which was also written by herself. Her song was one of the twelve finalists selected from the 2,500 songs from the auditions. The song won as the third place in the 2013 Himig Handog P-Pop Love Songs. On 7 March 2013, Aunor signed a contract with Star Music as its recording artist. Vehnee Saturno became her manager. Aunor was part of the Middle East Leg of the World Tour of the Philippine daytime television series Be Careful with My Heart. On 3 May 2013, her song entry "Do, Do, Do" was chosen as one of the twelve finalists for the second Philippine Popular Music Festival. However she later decided to withdraw from the competition due to her talent management's decision. Her self-titled album was eventually released on 4 July. In 2014, Aunor became one of the finalists in the Myx VJ Search. Aunor was chosen to interpret one of the finalist song at the 2014 Himig Handog. The song was entitled 'Pumapag-ibig' and was written by Jungee Marcelo. She performed the song with Rizza Cabrera and Seed Bunye at the finals night of the Himig Handog on 28 September 2014.

On 3 September 2015, it was announced that she would be performing under the stage name of Marion, dropping her surname. She then released her second studio album, MARION, on 31 August. The album tracks "Wanna Be Bad" and the cover song "I Love You Always Forever" were featured on the movie Ex with Benefits. She also wrote the carrier-single "You Don't Know Me" for the debut album of actress Kathryn Bernardo.

On 13 February 2018, she signed a new management under Viva Artists Agency for Viva Records and began releasing music under her full name. On February 7, 2020, she released the single "Mahal Kita Ngayon", under the name Marione.

Movie actress

Following the footsteps of her aunt singer turned actress the Superstar Nora Aunor, Marion is also ventured into an acting for Film.  Marion's 1st movie was a cameo appearance in a romantic movie, "The Breakup Playlist" in 2015, which stars Piolo Pascual & singer turned actress Sarah Geronimo-Guidicelli.  Her follow up movie and also her 2st debut supporting movie, "Tibak" in 2016.   5 years later, she's also starred in her next movie "Kaka" was released in 2021, which stars It's Showtime hosts Ion "Kuya Escort" Perez, and Jackie "Ate Girl" Gonzaga (also Jackie's debut movie).  Her recent new movie, "Revirginized" was released in 2021, with co star the Megastar Sharon Cuneta (as also her comeback movie in VIVA Films for the first time after 18 years since 2003), Rosanna Roses, former Tacloban Mayor Christina Gonzales, Albert Martinez, Abby Bautista & Marco Gumabao.

Discography

Studio albums

Singles
Wanna Be Bad (2015, original soundtrack from the film, "Ex With Benefits")
I Love You Always & Forever (2015, Original by Donna Lewis & also used from the soundtrack from the movie, "Ex With Benefits")
Mahal Kita Ngayon (2020)
Do, Do, Do   (a song finalist in the PhilPop Song Festival 2013)
Pumapag-Ibig (a song finalist in the Himig Handog P Pop Love Songs 2014)

Filmography

Television

Film

See also
Original Pilipino Music

References

Living people
ABS-CBN personalities
Actresses from Manila
Contraltos
Participants in Philippine reality television series
Singers from Manila
Star Magic
Star Music artists
VJs (media personalities)
21st-century Filipino women singers
1992 births